Auditory illusions are false perceptions of a real sound or outside stimulus. These false perceptions are the equivalent of an optical illusion: the listener hears either sounds which are not present in the stimulus, or sounds that should not be possible given the circumstance on how they were created.

Humans are fairly susceptible to illusions, despite an innate ability to process complex stimuli. Confirmation bias is believed to be largely responsible for the inaccurate judgments that people make when evaluating information, given that humans typically interpret and recall information that appeals to their own biases. Amongst these misinterpretations, known as illusions, falls the category of auditory illusions. The brain uses multiple senses simultaneously to process information, 
spatial information is processed with greater detail and accuracy in vision than in hearing.  Auditory illusions highlight areas where the human ear and brain, as organic survival tools, differentiate from perfect audio receptors; this shows that it is possible for a human being to hear something that is not there and be able to react to the sound they supposedly heard. When someone is experiencing an auditory illusion, their brain is falsely interpreting its surroundings and distorting their perception of the world around them.

Causes 
Many auditory illusions, particularly of music and of speech, result from hearing sound patterns that are highly probable, even though they are heard incorrectly. This is due to the influence of our knowledge and experience of many sounds we have heard. In order to prevent hearing echo created by perceiving multiple sounds coming from different spaces, the human auditory system relates the sounds as being from one source. However, that does not prevent people from being fooled by auditory illusions. Sounds that are found in words are called embedded sounds, and these sounds are the cause of some auditory illusions. A person's perception of a word can be influenced by the way they see the speaker's mouth move, even if the sound they hear is unchanged. For example, if someone is looking at two people saying "far" and "bar", the word they will hear will be determined by who they look at. If these sounds are played in a loop, the listener will be able to hear different words inside the same sound. People with brain damage can be more susceptible to auditory illusions and they can become more common for that person.

In music 
Composers have long been using the spatial components of music to alter the overall sound experienced by the listener. One of the more common methods of sound synthesis is the use of combination tones. Combination tones are illusions that are not physically present as sound waves, but rather, they are created by one's own neuromechanics. According to Purwins, auditory illusions have been used effectively by the following: Beethoven (Leonore Overture), Berg (Wozzeck), Krenek (Spiritus Intelligentiae, Sanctus), Ligeti (Études), Violin Concerto, Double Concerto, for flute, oboe and orchestra), Honegger (Pacific 231), and Stahnke (Partota 12).

In the 2017 film, Dunkirk, Hans Zimmer used a Shepard Tone to create a constant feeling of stress and tension.

Examples
There are a multitude of examples out in the world of auditory illusions. These are examples of some auditory illusions:
 
 
Binaural beats
 The constant spectrum melody
Deutsch's scale illusion
Franssen effect
Glissando illusion
Illusory continuity of tones
Illusory discontinuity
 Hearing a missing fundamental frequency, given other parts of the harmonic series
Various psychoacoustic tricks of lossy audio compression
McGurk effect
Octave illusion/Deutsch's high–low illusion
 Auditory pareidolia: hearing indistinct voices in random noise.
 The Shepard–Risset tone or scale, and the Deutsch tritone paradox
 Speech-to-song illusion 
 Yanny or Laurel

See also

Auditory system
Barber pole – auditory illusions compared to visual illusions
Diana Deutsch
Doppler effect – not an illusion, but real physical phenomenon
Holophonics
Jean-Claude Risset
Musical acoustics
Phantom rings
Pitch circularity
Psychoacoustics
Sharawadji effect 
Tinnitus

References

External links 
Diana Deutsch's Web Page
 

 
Music psychology
Psychoacoustics